The Southwest Penang Island District is a district within the Malaysian state of Penang. The district covers the southwestern half of Penang Island and borders the Northeast Penang Island District to the east. Balik Pulau is the district's administrative centre, while Bayan Lepas is the largest town within the district.

Although Penang Island consists of two districts, both fall under the jurisdiction of the city of George Town, which encompasses the entirety of the island plus the surrounding islets. The city's jurisdiction is exercised by the Penang Island City Council in the centre of George Town, which lies within the Northeast Penang Island District.

History 
In 1786, the British East India Company had taken control of Penang Island, establishing the city of George Town at the island's northeastern tip. For several decades since, the island was governed directly from George Town, with no administrative divisions on the island.

In 1888, a District and Land Office was established in Balik Pulau at the southwest of the island. Thus, the Southwest Penang Island District was created, effectively dividing Penang Island into two districts. Both districts first appeared in official maps of Penang dating back to the 1890s.

Geography 

The Southwest Penang Island District covers southern and western Penang Island, as well as parts of the island's central hill ranges. Under the district are the following towns and residential areas.

Towns

Residential areas and villages

The Southwest Penang Island District comprises 16.8% of Penang's total land mass. It is further divided into 22 mukims.
 Sungai Pinang
 Sungai Rusa
 Permatang Pasir
 Bagan Ayer Itam
 Titi Teras
 Kongsi
 Kampong Paya
 Sungai Burong
 Pulau Betong
 Dataran Ginting
 Pantai Acheh
 Telok Bahang
 Sungai Rusa & Bukit Sungai Pinang
 Batu Itam
 Bukit Balik Pulau
 Pondok Upeh
 Bukit Ginting
 Bukit Pasir Panjang
 Bukit Gemuroh
 Bukit Relau
 Telok Kumbar
 Bayan Lepas

Governance 

The administrative centre of the Southwest Penang Island District is Balik Pulau, where the District and Land Office is situated.

Local government 
Although the districts in Malaysia were created for the purpose of land administration and revenue, in practice, it is the local government that ensures the provision of basic amenities and maintenance of urban infrastructure.

Notably, both districts on Penang Island are under the jurisdiction of the Penang Island City Council, which is based in the heart of George Town. With a history dating back to 1800, it is the oldest local government in Malaysia. The current Mayor of Penang Island is Yew Tung Seang, who was appointed into the position by the Penang state government in 2018. The Mayor's term lasts for two years.

Electoral constituencies

Demographics

The following is based on the 2020 Malaysian Census conducted by Malaysia's Department of Statistics.

According to data obtained from the census, over 62% of the population within the Southwest Penang Island District were concentrated around Bayan Lepas, making it the largest town within the district.

Education 
Most schools in the district are national schools, which are run under Malaysia's Ministry of Education. In addition, a few international schools, such as the Prince of Wales International School and the Straits International School, have been set up in Bayan Lepas and Balik Pulau.

The Penang State Library operates a branch in Balik Pulau.

Health care 
The Balik Pulau Hospital is the main hospital within the Southwest Penang Island District. It complements the Penang General Hospital in providing healthcare to the citizens on Penang Island.

Pantai Mutiara Hospital in Bayan Lepas is the sole private hospital in the district.

Transportation

Land 
The Southwest Penang Island District is connected to the rest of Peninsular Malaysia via the Second Penang Bridge, which runs between Batu Maung at the southeastern tip of Penang Island and Batu Kawan on the mainland. The bridge, with a length of 24 km, is now the longest in Southeast Asia.

Federal Route 6 is a winding trunk road that serves as the pan-island road, forming a circular loop along the length of Penang Island's coastline. The road links Bayan Lepas, Balik Pulau and Teluk Bahang with the centre of George Town in the Northeast Penang Island District.

Public transportation throughout Penang Island is provided by Rapid Penang, which has public bus services between the city centre, Bayan Lepas (including the Penang International Airport), Balik Pulau and Teluk Bahang.

Air 

The Penang International Airport in Bayan Lepas serves as the major airport within the northern region of Peninsular Malaysia. Completed in 1935, it is also the oldest civilian airport in the nation.

Today, it is one of the busiest airports in Malaysia in terms of cargo tonnage and passenger traffic, highlighting the role Penang Island plays as a tourist destination and a major manufacturing hub. The airport's proximity to the Bayan Lepas Free Industrial Zone allows for the easy transportation of goods to and from the factories in Bayan Lepas. In addition, it connects Penang with several major regional cities, including Kuala Lumpur, Singapore, Bangkok, Jakarta, Hong Kong, Guangzhou, Taipei, Ho Chi Minh City and Yangon.

Tourist attractions 

The Snake Temple in Bayan Lepas is said to be the only Chinese temple to be inhabited by snakes. Built in the 1850s by a Buddhist monk, it has attracted varieties of pit vipers, which are believed to be rendered harmless by the incense. The temple is also a focal point of the annual Chinese New Year celebrations, during which a flame-watching ceremony is held to predict the fortunes of the next 12 months.

The Penang War Museum is located at the southeastern tip of Penang Island. The sprawling complex was originally Fort Batu Maung, built by the British Army in the 1930s to defend Penang Island against amphibious invasion. However, during World War II, the British Army abandoned the fort to the Imperial Japanese Army without a fight. Neglected after the war, the fortress was converted into a museum in 2002, and features bunkers, tunnels and other military structures.

Balik Pulau is famous for its agricultural plantations, which are rarely found elsewhere on Penang Island. In recent years, agricultural tourism is booming in Balik Pulau, as tourists from other states and abroad flock to the town to sample fresh durians and nutmegs.

The Penang National Park, covering 2,562 hectares of rainforests, swamps and beaches at the northwestern tip of Penang Island, is the smallest gazetted national park in Malaysia. Within the park are some of the most pristine beaches on Penang Island, such as Kerachut Beach and Monkey Beach. A canopy walk also allows visitors an impressive view of the lush rainforest underneath.

In addition, the adjacent town of Teluk Bahang is home to unique agricultural attractions, such as the Penang Butterfly Farm, Tropical Spice Garden and Tropical Fruit Farm.

See also

References

1888 establishments in British Malaya